Anna Khanum (died 9 September 1647) was the consort of the Safavid king Safi (r. 1629–1642). She was the mother of her husband's successor, King Abbas II (r. 1642–1666).

Early life
Anna Khanum was of Circassian origin. She was given as slave concubine to Shah Safi, the son of Mohammad Baqer Mirza, the eldest son of Abbas I (r. 1588–1629). She became the mother of Abbas II. The Safavid kings did not marry, but reproduced by use of slave concubines, who became their consorts.

As queen mother
After Safi's death in 1642, his son Abbas II ascended the throne. A triumvirate consisting of Saru Taqi, Mohammad Ali Khan and Jani Khan Shamlu, worked in alliance with Anna Khanum and effectively wielded power at the court for the first three years of Abbas's reign. Saru Taqi maintained his position as grand vizier. Anna Khanum was his ally and the one to consolidate power within his faction. Jean Chardin, a French jeweller and traveller, noted their friendship and collaboration in his discussion after Abbas's accession to the throne in 1645. He said the following about them:

Saru Taqi was assassinated by Jani Khan, probably with Abbas's consent who was attempting to gain his independence from his mother and her slave allies. Anna Khanum was extremely angry at Jani Khan. She sent one of her principal eunuchs, probably the eldest, rish sefid of the harem to Jani Khan, asking him to explain his actions. He responded rudely calling Saru Taqi a dog and a thief, and then proceeded to insult Anna Khanum personally.

Following the murder, Jani Khan himself was betrayed by the royal sommelier, Safi Qoli Beg (son of Amir Beg Armani), who feared that the ultimate objective of the conspiracy was the overthrow of the Shah himself. But the real inspiration behind the terrible revenge that followed was Anna Khanum. Jani Khan was assassinated four days after he executed Saru Taqi.

Sponsorships
Anna Khanum is known to have sponsored the construction of a mosque and a school in the Abbasabad suburb of the royal capital Isfahan.

Death
Anna Khanum died on 9 September 1647.

References

Sources
 

 

Iranian people of Circassian descent
Safavid concubines
17th-century Iranian women
1647 deaths
17th-century people of Safavid Iran
17th-century slaves